In forma pauperis (IFP or i.f.p.) is a Latin legal term meaning "in the character or manner of a pauper". It refers to the ability of an indigent person to proceed in court without payment of the usual fees associated with a lawsuit or appeal.

United Kingdom
IFP was abolished in the United Kingdom in favor of a legal aid approach as part of the Legal Aid and Advice Act 1949.

United States
In the United States, the IFP designation is given by both state and federal courts to someone who is without the funds to pursue the normal costs of a lawsuit or a criminal defense. The status is usually granted by a judge without a hearing, and it entitles the person to a waiver of normal costs, and sometimes in criminal cases the appointment of counsel.  While court-imposed costs such as filing fees are waived, the litigant is still responsible for other costs incurred in bringing the action such as deposition and witness fees.  However, in federal court, a pauper can obtain free service of process through the United States Marshal's Service.

Approximately two-thirds of writ of certiorari petitions to the Supreme Court are filed in forma pauperis. Most of those petitioners are prisoners. Statistically, petitions that appear on the Supreme Court's in forma pauperis docket are substantially less likely to be granted review than others on the docket.

Gideon v. Wainwright, 372 U.S. 335 (1963), is a landmark case in United States Supreme Court history where in forma pauperis was invoked. In forma pauperis is usually granted in connection to pro se petitioners, but the two concepts are separate and distinct.

See also
 Pauper's oath

Notes

External links

Latin legal terminology